Erythrolamprus bizona, commonly known as the double-banded false coral snake, is a species of colubrid snake, which is endemic to northern South America and Central America.

Geographic range
It is found in Colombia, Venezuela, Costa Rica, Nicaragua, Panama, and on the island of Trinidad (in the Republic of Trinidad and Tobago).

Mimicry
Similar in pattern to a coral snake, this species probably gains protection through mimicry.

Diet
It probably feeds mainly on other snakes.

Habitat
It is often found in the leaf litter or burrowed in the soil in rain forests.

Symbiotic relationship
It burrows primarily near the Pouteria caimito, commonly known as the abiu, a tropical fruit tree, the nutrients of which supply the snake's clutch of eggs. In turn the tree is fertilized by the snake's urine and embryotic fluid.

References

Further reading

Jan G. 1863. Enumerazione sistematica degli ofidi appartenenti al gruppo Coronellidae. Arch. Zool. Anat.Fisiol. 2 (2): 213–330. (Erythrolamprus aesculapii [var.] bizona, pp. 314–316.)

bizona
Reptiles of Colombia
Reptiles of Costa Rica
Reptiles of Nicaragua
Reptiles of Panama
Reptiles of Trinidad and Tobago
Reptiles of Venezuela
Reptiles described in 1863
CategoryTaxa named by Giorgio Jan